A. V. Seshagiri Rao (1926 – 17 June 2007) was a Kannada film director.

Film career
He started his film career at a young age and directed about 50 films including in Kannada, Telugu and Tamil. He made his directorial debut in Telugu film Pendli Pilipu starring N. T. Rama Rao and Devika in 1962. He gave blockbusters like Rajkumar-starrer Sampath Ge Sawal, Bahadur Gandu and Bettadha Huli to the Kannada film industry. His last film was Bahadura Hennu in which actress Roopa Ganguly had played the lead role.

Filmography

Kannada

Death
He died following a fall at his house in Chennai, India, where died of brain haemorrhage.

References

External links 
 

Kannada film directors
Telugu film directors
1926 births
2007 deaths
20th-century Indian film directors
Film directors from Chennai